The Colorado potato beetle (Leptinotarsa decemlineata), also known as the Colorado beetle, the ten-striped spearman, the ten-lined potato beetle, or the potato bug, is a major pest of potato crops. Native to the Rocky Mountains, it spread rapidly in potato crops across America and then Europe from 1859 onwards.

Taxonomy

The Colorado potato beetle was first observed in 1811 by Thomas Nuttall and was formally described in 1824 by American entomologist Thomas Say. The beetles were collected in the Rocky Mountains, where they were feeding on the buffalo bur, Solanum rostratum. The genus Leptinotarsa is assigned to the chrysolmelid beetle tribe Chrysomelini (in subfamily Chrysomelinae).

Description
They weigh 50-170 mg. The beetles are orange-yellow in colour with 10 characteristic black stripes on their elytra. The specific name decemlineata, meaning 'ten-lined', derives from this feature. Adult beetles may, however, be visually confused with L. juncta, the false potato beetle, which is not an agricultural pest. L. juncta also has alternating black and white strips on its back, but one of the white strips in the center of each wing cover is missing and replaced by a light brown strip.

The beetle larva has four instar stages. The head remains black throughout these stages, but the pronotum changes colour from black in first- and second-instar larvae to having an orange-brown edge in its third-instar. In fourth-instar larvae, about half the pronotum is coloured light brown. This tribe is characterised within the subfamily by round to oval-shaped convex bodies, which are usually brightly coloured, simple claws which separate at the base, open cavities behind the procoxae, and a variable apical segment of the maxillary palp.

Distribution
The beetle is most likely native to the area between Colorado and northern Mexico, and was discovered in 1824 by Thomas Say in the Rocky Mountains. It is found in North America, and is present in every state and province except Alaska, California, Hawaii, and Nevada. It now has a wide distribution across Europe and Asia, totalling over 16 million km2.

Its first association with the potato plant (Solanum tuberosum) was not made until about 1859, when it began destroying potato crops in the region of Omaha, Nebraska. Its spread eastward was rapid, at an average distance of 140 km per year. By 1874 it had reached the Atlantic Coast. From 1871,  American entomologist Charles Valentine Riley warned Europeans about the potential for an accidental infestation caused by the transportation of the beetle from America. From 1875, several Western European countries, including Germany, Belgium, France, and Switzerland, banned imports of American potatoes to avoid infestation by L. decemlineata.

These controls proved ineffective, as the beetle soon reached Europe. In 1877, L. decemlineata reached the United Kingdom and was first recorded from Liverpool docks, but it did not become established. Many further outbreaks have occurred; the species has been eradicated in the UK at least 163 times. The last major outbreak was in 1976. It remains as a notifiable quarantine pest in the United Kingdom and is monitored by DEFRA  to prevent it from becoming established. A cost-benefit analysis from 1981 suggested that the cost of the measures used to exclude L. decemlineata from the UK was less than the likely costs of control if it became established.

Elsewhere in Europe, the beetle became established near USA military bases in Bordeaux during or immediately following World War I and had proceeded to spread by the beginning of World War II to Belgium, the Netherlands, and Spain. The population increased dramatically during and immediately following World War II and spread eastward, and the beetle is now found over much of the continent. After World War II, in the Soviet occupation zone of Germany, almost half of all potato fields were infested by the beetle by 1950. In East Germany, they were known as Amikäfer ('Yankee beetles') following a governmental claim that the beetles were dropped by American planes. In the European Union, it remains a regulated (quarantine) pest for the Republic of Ireland, Balearic Islands, Cyprus, Malta, and southern parts of Sweden and Finland. It is not established in any of these member states, but occasional infestations can occur when, for example, wind blows adults from Russia to Finland.

The beetle has the potential to spread to temperate areas of East Asia, India, South America, Africa, New Zealand, and Australia.

Lifecycle
Colorado potato beetle females are very prolific and are capable of laying over 500 eggs in a 4- to 5-week period. They are usually deposited in batches of about 30 on the underside of host leaves. Development of all life stages depends on temperature. After 4–15 days, the eggs hatch into reddish-brown larvae with humped backs and two rows of dark brown spots on either side. They feed on the leaves of their host plants. Larvae progress through four distinct growth stages (instars). The first through third instars each last about 2–3 days duration; the fourth lasts 4–7 days. Upon reaching full size, each fourth instar spends several days as a nonfeeding prepupa, which can be recognized by its inactivity and lighter coloration. The prepupae drop to the soil and burrow to a depth of several inches, then pupate. In 5 to 10 days, the adult beetle emerges to feed and mate. This beetle can thus go from egg to adult in as little as 21 days. Depending on temperature, light conditions, and host quality, the adults may enter diapause and delay emergence until spring. They then return to their host plants to mate and feed; overwintering adults may begin mating within 24 hours of spring emergence. In some locations, three or more generations may occur each growing season.

Behavior and ecology

Diet
L. decemlineata has a strong association with plants in the family Solanaceae, particularly those of the genus Solanum. It is directly associated with 
Solanum cornutum (buffalo-bur), Solanum nigrum (black nightshade), Solanum melongena (eggplant or aubergine), Solanum dulcamara (bittersweet nightshade), Solanum luteum (hairy nightshade), Solanum tuberosum (potato), and Solanum elaeagnifolium (silverleaf nightshade). They are also associated with other plants in this family, namely the species Solanum lycopersicum (tomato) and the genus Capsicum (pepper).

Predators

At least 13 insect genera, three spider families, one phalangid (Opiliones), and one mite have been recorded as either generalist or specialized predators of the varying stages of L. decemlineata. These include the ground beetle Lebia grandis, the coccinellid beetles Coleomegilla maculata and Hippodamia convergens, the shield bugs Perillus bioculatus and Podisus maculiventris,  various species of the lacewing genus Chrysopa, the wasp genus Polistes, and the damsel bug genus Nabis.

The predatory ground beetle L. grandis is a predator of both the eggs and larvae of L. decemlineata, and its larvae are parasitoids of the pupae. An adult L. grandis may consume up to 23 eggs or 3.3 larvae in a single day.

In a laboratory experiment, Podisus maculiventris was used as a predatory threat to female L. decemlineata specimens, resulting in the production of unviable trophic eggs alongside viable ones; this response to a predator ensured that additional food was available for newly hatched offspring to increase their survival rate. The same experiment also demonstrated the cannibalism of unhatched eggs by newly hatched L. decemlineata larvae as an antipredator response.

As an agricultural pest

Potato crop pest
Around 1840, L. decemlineata adopted the cultivated potato into its host range and it rapidly became a most destructive pest of potato crops. It is today considered to be the most important insect defoliator of potatoes. It may also cause considerable damage to tomato and eggplant crops with both adults and larvae feeding on the plant's foliage. Larvae may defoliate potato plants resulting in yield losses up to 100% if the damage occurs prior to tuber formation. Larvae may consume 40 cm2 of potato leaves during the entire larval stage, but adults are capable of consuming 10 cm2 of foliage per day.

The economic cost of insecticide resistance is significant, but published data on the subject are minimal. In 1994, total costs of the insecticide and crop losses in the US state of Michigan were $13.3 million, representing 13.7% of the total value of the crop. The estimate of the cost implication of insecticides and crop losses per hectare is $138–368. Long-term increased cost to the Michigan potato industry caused by insecticide resistance in Colorado potato beetle was estimated at $0.9 to $1.4 million each year.

Insecticidal management
The large-scale use of insecticides in agricultural crops effectively controlled the pest until it became resistant to DDT in 1952 and dieldrin in 1958. Insecticides remain the main method of pest control on commercial farms. However, many chemicals are often unsuccessful when used against this pest because of the beetle's ability to rapidly develop insecticide resistance. Different populations in different geographic regions have, between them, developed resistance to all major classes of insecticide, although not every population is resistant to every chemical. The species as a whole has evolved resistance to 56 different chemical insecticides. The mechanisms used include improved metabolism of the chemicals, reduced sensitivity of target sites, less penetration and greater excretion of the pesticides, and some changes in the behavior of the beetles.

Nonpesticidal management

Bacterial insecticides can be effective if application is targeted towards the vulnerable early-instar larvae. Two strains of the bacterium Bacillus thuringiensis produce toxins that kill the larvae. Other forms of pest control, through nonpesticidal management are available. Feeding can be inhibited by applying antifeedants, such as fungicides or products derived from Neem (Azadirachta indica), but these may have negative effects on the plants, as well. The steam distillate of fresh leaves and flowers of tansy (Tanacetum vulgare) contains high levels of camphor and umbellulone, and these chemicals are strongly repellent to L. decemlineata.

Beauveria bassiana (Hyphomycetes) is a pathogenic fungus that infects a wide range of insect species, including the Colorado potato beetle. It has shown to be particularly effective as a biological pesticide for L. decemlineata when used in combination with B. thuringiensis.

Crop rotation is, however, the most important cultural control of L. decemlineata. Rotation may delay the infestation of potatoes and can reduce the build-up of early-season beetle populations because the adults emerging from diapause can only disperse to new food sources by walking. One 1984 study showed that rotating potatoes with nonhost plants reduced the density of early-season adults by 95.8%.

Other cultural controls may be used in combination with crop rotation: Mulching the potato crop with straw early in the growing season may reduce the beetle's ability to locate potato fields, and the mulch creates an environment that favours beetle's predators; Plastic-lined trenches have been used as pitfall traps to catch the beetles as they move toward a field of potatoes in the spring, exploiting their inability to fly immediately after emergence; flamethrowers may also be used to kill the beetles when they are visible at the top of the plant's foliage.

Relationship with humans

Cold War villain

During the Cold War,  some countries in the Warsaw Pact claimed that the beetles had been introduced by the CIA in an attempt to reduce food security by destroying the agriculture of the Soviet Union. A widespread campaign was launched against the beetles; posters were put up and school children were mobilized to gather the pests and kill them in benzene or spirit.

Philately

L. decemlineata is an iconic species and has been used as an image on stamps because of its association with the recent history of both North America and Europe. For example, in 1956, Romania issued a set of four stamps calling attention to the campaign against insect pests, and it was featured on a 1967 stamp issued in Austria. The beetle also appeared on stamps issued in Benin, Tanzania, the United Arab Emirates, and Mozambique.

In popular culture
Neapolitan mandolins (also called Italian mandolins) are often called tater bugs, a nickname given by American luthier Orville Gibson, because the shape and stripes of the different color wood strips resemble the back of the Colorado beetle.

The fans of Alemannia Aachen carry the nickname "Kartoffelkäfer", from the German name for the Colorado beetle, because of striped yellow-black jerseys of the team.

During the 2014 pro-Russian unrest in Ukraine, the word , from the Ukrainian and Russian term for Colorado beetle, gained popularity among Ukrainians as a derogatory term to describe pro-Russian separatists in the Donetsk and Luhansk Oblasts (provinces) of Eastern Ukraine. The nickname reflects the similarity of black and orange stripes on St. George's ribbons worn by many of the separatists.

Notes
1.For a more comprehensive list of natural predators, pathogens and parasitoids, see here.

References

External links

PotatoBeetle.org
Polish Film Chronicle: Fight against Colorado Beetle 

Chrysomelinae
Potatoes
Agricultural pest insects
Insects of the United States
Beetle
Beetles of North America
Beetles described in 1824
Articles containing video clips
Taxa named by Thomas Say
Insects in culture
Beetles of Europe
Biological anti-agriculture weapons